Cathedral of Saints Peter and Paul may refer to:

Africa
 Sts. Peter and Paul Cathedral, Parakou, Borgou Department, Benin
 Cathedral of Saints Peter and Paul, Douala, Littoral Region, Cameroon
 Sts. Peter and Paul Cathedral, Lubumbashi, Haut-Katanga Province, Democratic Republic of the Congo
 St. Peter and St. Paul Cathedral, Abeokuta, Ogun State, Nigeria

Americas
 Saint Peter and Paul Cathedral, Paramaribo, Suriname
 Saints Peter and Paul Cathedral (Indianapolis), Indiana, United States
 Cathedral Basilica of Saints Peter and Paul (Philadelphia), Pennsylvania, United States
 Cathedral of Saints Peter and Paul, Providence, Rhode Island, United States
 Cathedral Church of Saint Peter and Saint Paul, Washington, D.C., United States
 Saints Peter and Paul Cathedral (St. Thomas, U.S. Virgin Islands)
 St. Peter and St. Paul Cathedral, Maracaibo, Zulia, Venezuela

Asia
 St. Peter and St. Paul Cathedral, Nagoya, Japan
 Saints Peter and Paul Cathedral (Ulaanbaatar), Mongolia
 Cathedral of Sts. Peter and Paul, Faisalabad, Punjab, Pakistan
 Saints Peter and Paul Cathedral (Calbayog), Philippines
 Saints Peter and Paul Cathedral (Sorsogon), Philippines

Australia
 Ss Peter and Paul Cathedral, Port Pirie, South Australia
 Sts. Peter and Paul Cathedral, Melbourne, Victoria

Europe 

 Peter and Paul Cathedral (Gomel), Belarus
 Cathedral of St. Peter and St. Paul in Đakovo, Slavonia, Croatia
 Cathedral of St. Peter and Paul, Brno, Czech Republic
 St Peter and St Paul's Cathedral, Tallinn, Estonia
 Cathedral of St. Peter and St. Paul, Nantes, Pays de la Loire, France
 Cathedrale Saint-Pierre-et-Saint-Paul de Troyes, Champagne, France
 Basilica of Sts. Peter and Paul, Dillingen, Germany
 Sts. Peter and Paul Cathedral, Pécs, Baranya, Hungary
 Cathedral of Saint Peter and Saint Paul, Ennis, County Clare, Ireland
 Cathedral Basilica of Saints Peter and Paul, Kaunas, Lithuania
 Cathedral of Saints Peter and Paul, Šiauliai, Lithuania
 Sts. Peter and Paul Cathedral, Gliwice, Silesian Voivodeship, Poland
 Archcathedral Basilica of St. Peter and St. Paul, Poznań, Greater Poland Voivodeship, Poland
 Cathedral of Saints Peter and Paul, Constanța, Romania
 Sts. Peter and Paul Cathedral, Kamianets-Podilskyi, Khmelnytskyi Oblast, Ukraine
 Saint Peter and Paul Cathedral, Lutsk, Volyn Oblast, Ukraine
 Cathedral Church of SS. Peter and Paul, Clifton, Bristol, England, United Kingdom
 Cathedral Church of St Peter and St Paul, Sheffield, England, United Kingdom

Russia
 Saints Peter and Paul Cathedral, Saint Petersburg, Russia
 St. Peter and St. Paul Cathedral, Saratov, Russia
 Saints Peter and Paul Cathedral (Kazan), Tatarstan, Russia

See also
 St. Peter and St. Paul's Church (disambiguation)
 St. Peter's Cathedral (disambiguation)
 St. Paul's Cathedral (disambiguation)

Cathedral